Musafir is a word in Arabic, Persian, Bengali, Hindi and Urdu meaning 'traveller'. In Romanian and Turkish it has come to mean 'guest'. It may refer to:

Musafir (1940 film), Indian social drama film by Chaturbhuj Doshi
Musafir (1957 film), Indian drama film by Hrishikesh Mukherjee
Beyond the Last Mountain, 1976 Pakistani English-language film by Javed Jabbar, released in Urdu as Musafir
Musafir (1986 film), Indian drama film by Jabbar Patel, based on Ashi Pakhare Yeti by Vijay Tendulkar
Musafir (2004 film), Indian action-thriller film by Sanjay Gupta
Musafir (2013 film), Indian drama film by Pramod Pappan
Musafir (2016 film), Bangladeshi film by Ashiqur Rahman